Aljamea-tus-Saifiyah is an Arabic academy dedicated to Islamic learning based in India, Pakistan, and Kenya. Established in Surat as Dars-e Saifee  by Abde'Ali Saifuddin, it was after extensive  renovation and expansion ( and ) carried out by Taher Saifuddin and Mohammed Burhanuddin, the university gained prominence. Today, as holder of the office of Dāʿī al-Mutlaq, Mufaddal Saifuddin is the sole benefactor of the institute.

History 

Syedna Abdeali Saifuddin established Dars-e Saifee, a theology school for the Dawoodi Bohra community, in 1810.

Mohammed Burhanuddin undertook a complete renovation and expansion of the campus buildings.

In 1969, during his 57th birthday celebration, Mohammed Burhanuddin established Aljamea-tus-Saifiyah in Karachi, Pakistan. The construction of this 14-acre campus that commenced on same year was completed by Burhanuddin, and inaugurated by the President of Pakistan, Mohammed Zia-ul-Haq, on 4th November 1983.

In 2011, during centennial celebrations, Mohammed Burhanuddin established Aljamea-tus-Saifiyah in Nairobi, Kenya. The construction of this 14-acre campus that commenced in 2013 was completed under the reign of Mufaddal Saifuddin, Burhanuddin's son and successor, and inaugurated by the President of Kenya, Uhuru Kenyatta, on 20 April 2017.

In 2013, during golden jubilee celebrations of his throne, Mohammed Burhanuddin established Aljamea-tus-Saifiyah at Marol in Mumbai, India. The construction of this 14-acre campus that commenced in 2015 was completed under the reign of Mufaddal Saifuddin, and was inaugurated by the Prime Minister of India, Narendra Modi, on 10 February 2023.

Ashara Mubaraka 
In 2021, Mufaddal Saifuddin delivered Ashara Mubaraka sermons in the Nairobi campus of Aljamea-tus-Saifiyah's Masjid al-Zahra. It marked the first time that Ashara Mubaraka was hosted by Aljamea-tus-Saifiyah.

Curriculum 

Its educational focus is the Quran, Islamic sciences, Islamic Jurisprudence, Arabic language, and Literature. Students are sent around the world for religious duties during the Ashara Mubaraka and Ramadan.

A 11-year course of study is divided into three phases: The first phase is four years and involves 55 courses, the second phase is five years, subdivided into three years with 75 courses and two years with 90 subjects, and the final two-year phase focuses on specialization and advanced studies in Islamic and Arabic sciences.

At the end of the 11th year, the students graduate with the degree of al-Faqih al-Jayyid, and are sent on khidmah to hajj and other pilgrimages at full cost to the office of the Da'i al-Mutlaq. These graduates, as per tradition, invite the Da'i al-Mutlaq for a ziyafat as a show of gratitude.

The al-Faqih al-Jayyid degree is equivalent to the Masters of Arts from Aligarh Muslim University, recognized by Al Azhar and Cairo University. Four years of study at the university is equivalent to secondary education (GCSE) and seven years is equivalent to Higher Secondary (GCE A Level) post which the students qualify to test for an International Baccalaureate, recognized by Oxford University and others.

Campuses

The principal university campus is situated in Surat (India) with three sister campuses in Karachi (Pakistan), Nairobi (Kenya), and Marol (Mumbai, India).

Surat 
Mohammed Burhanuddin renovated the Surat campus in : The aesthetics of the new buildings complement their purpose: to provide an inspiring and conducive environment for learning and nurturing. The academic block north houses classrooms, administrative offices, Iwaan (a large hall where annual exams are held amongst other events that involve the entire student and teaching faculties), and Al-Masjid al-Fatimi (which sits between the garden and the Iwaan). Opposite to the academic block is a library that houses more than 150,000 books and subscribes to more than 100 periodicals.  The Masakin (boys' hostel) and Rabwat (girls' hostel) blocks are adjacent to the academic block.

South of the campus is Devdi Mubarak, the Da'i al-Mutlaq's residence, at the end of which is Mahad al-Zahra: An institute for memorization and recitation of Quran, and for Quranic arts and sciences. Further south are Mazar-e Saifee (mausoleum of seven Dua't Mutlaqeen) and Masjid-e Moazzam.

Rectors 

Following the death of its first rector post-renovations, Yusuf Najmuddin in 1987 (1407 ھ), Mohammed Burhanuddin appointed four rectors in his place: His two brothers Qasim Hakimuddin, Abbas Fakhurdddin, and his two sons Qaidjoher Ezzuddin and Mufaddal Saifuddin. Mohammed Burhanuddin instructed the newly appointed rectors that in the event that there was a difference of opinion amongst them, then Mufaddal Saifuddin's opinion should take precedence.

Following the death of Mohammed Burhanuddin, on 16 Rabi al-Awwal 1435 ھ (17 January 2014), and Mufaddal Saifuddin's succession as 53rd Dai al-Mutlaq, he appointed his son Jafar us Sadiq Imaduddin as Aljamea's fourth rector.

After the death of Abbas Fakhruddin on 14 February 2018, and of Qasim Hakimuddin shortly thereafter on 5 April 2018 (in Surat), Mufaddal Saifuddin appointed Aliasgar Kalimuddin and Malik-ul Ashtar Shujauddin as Rectors.

See also 
 MSB Educational Institute

Notes

References

External links 
 Official website
 Al Jamea tus Saifiyah Url accessed on Nov 27, 2006
 Al Mawaid
 Al Jamea-tus-Saifiyah, Karachi - Arabic Academy
 

Ismaili universities and colleges
Dawoodi Bohras
Islamic universities and colleges in India